Sacy may refer to:

 People
  (1746-94), French politician
  (1896-1993), French civil servant
 Louis de Sacy (1654-1727), French author and lawyer
 Louis-Isaac Lemaistre de Sacy (1613-84), French theologian and humanist
 Silvestre de Sacy (1758-1838), French linguist and orientalist
 Ustazade Silvestre de Sacy (1801-79), French journalist.

Places (all of which are communes in France)
 Sacy, Marne, in the Marne département
 Sacy, Yonne, in the Yonne département
 Sacy-le-Grand, in the Oise département
 Sacy-le-Petit, in the Oise département

 Other uses
 Sacy (grape), a French wine grape

See also